The 1959 NCAA Swimming and Diving Championships were contested on March 26−28, 1959 at Teagle Pool at Cornell University in Ithaca, New York at the 23rd annual officially NCAA-sanctioned swim meet to determine the team and individual national champions of men's collegiate swimming and diving in the United States. Including the championships held before NCAA sponsorship in 1937, this was the 36th collegiate championship overall.

Michigan once again retained the national title, the Wolverines' ninth (and third consecutive), after finishing a record ninety-three points ahead of Ohio State in the team standings.

Team standings
Note: Top 10 only
(H) = Hosts
Full results

See also
List of college swimming and diving teams

References

NCAA Division I Men's Swimming and Diving Championships
NCAA Swimming And Diving Championships
NCAA Swimming And Diving Championships
NCAA Swimming And Diving Championships